Defending champion Lleyton Hewitt defeated Juan Carlos Ferrero in the final, 7–5, 7–5, 2–6, 2–6, 6–4 to win the singles tennis title at the 2002 Tennis Masters Cup.

Future record six-time champion Roger Federer made his tournament debut; he was defeated by Hewitt in the semifinals.

Seeds

Alternate

Draw

Finals

Red group
Standings are determined by: 1. number of wins; 2. number of matches; 3. in two-players-ties, head-to-head records; 4. in three-players-ties, percentage of sets won, or of games won; 5. steering-committee decision.

Gold group
Standings are determined by: 1. number of wins; 2. number of matches; 3. in two-players-ties, head-to-head records; 4. in three-players-ties, percentage of sets won, or of games won; 5. steering-committee decision.

See also
ATP World Tour Finals appearances

External links
 2002 Tennis Masters Cup Draw

Singles